John Melady is a Canadian non-fiction author from Seaforth, Ontario Canada . A former high school vice-principal in Trenton, Ontario, he writes primarily about 19th and 20th century Canadian history with a usual focus on acts exhibiting courage.

Education
John Melady received a Bachelor of Arts in English from The University of Western Ontario. He received his Masters of Education from the University of Toronto.

Book Subjects
The subject of his 2005 book 'Double Trap: The Last Public Hanging in Canada' was his ancestral cousin, 19th century convicted murderer Nicholas Melady, who was jailed and executed in Goderich, Ontario in 1869.

Books
 Jordan L. Bergereau H. E. Communications
Explosion - Trenton Disaster Mika Publishing Company (1980)H.E.Communications 2nd 
edition 2014 
Escape From Canada!(1981) 
Korea: Canada's Forgotten War (1983) 
Cross of Valour (1985)
Overtime Overdue: The Bill Barilko Story (1988) ASIN: B000JLHO72
Pilots [1989] 
Heartbreak and Heroism (1997) 
Acts of Courage (1998) 
Star of Courage [2001]  
Double Trap: The Last Public Hanging in Canada (2005) 
Pearson's Prize: Canada and the Suez Crisis (2006) ISBN 1-550- 02611-9
Canadians In Space:The Forever Frontier
Breakthrough: Canada's Greatest Inventions and Innovations (Dundurn 2013)

References

Writers from Ontario
1938 births
Living people
University of Toronto alumni
University of Western Ontario alumni